Matelea borinquensis, known commonly as the San Lorenzo milkvine, is a species of plant in the family Apocynaceae. It is a forest plant, endemic to Puerto Rico, and is found in Cerro Pelucho, San Lorenzo.

References

borinquensis
Endemic flora of Puerto Rico
Flora without expected TNC conservation status